Emmanuel Di Donna (born December 1971) is a New York-based art dealer, and director of Di Donna Galleries (formerly Blain Di Donna), a secondary market gallery specializing in artworks by Impressionist and 20th century European and American masters.

Di Donna appeared on Art + Auction's 'Power 100' list in 2010, and featured again in the 2012 edition. He is married and currently lives in New York.

Career 
Di Donna is an expert  in Surrealist and Modern art, having staged a number of monographic exhibitions; René Magritte, Dangerous Liaisons (2011); André Masson, The Mythology of Desire: Masterworks from 1925 to 1945 (2012); Jean Arp: A Collection of Wood Reliefs and Collages (2012), Paul Delvaux (2013), which was curated in close collaboration with the Paul Delvaux Foundation, and was also displayed in London. In October 2013, Blain|Di Donna present Dada & Surrealist Objects (2013), which exhibits works by major artists including Salvador Dalí, René Magritte, Jean Arp and Alberto Giacometti.

Biography

After a master's degree in History of Art from the Courtauld Institute of Art in London, he joined Sotheby's in 1994 as a Director of their Paris office. He moved to London in 2001 as Acting Head of its Impressionist and Modern Art Department. In 2002, he was  appointed Deputy Head of Sotheby's London operations. He moved to New York in 2005 and participated in many of the firm's sales of property from private collections, including works from the Man Ray Estate, the Collection of Mrs Walter Buhl Ford III and the Collection of Stanley J. Seeger. He  was involved in many landmark auctions in London and New York, including the sale of Kazimir Malevich's Suprematist Composition, which sold for $60m in 2008.

He held the positions vice chairman of Sotheby's Worldwide, Senior Specialist and Head of Sotheby's Impressionist & Modern Art Evening Sales. After 17 years with the firm, he departed in August 2010 and founded Blain|Di Donna with London Contemporary Art dealer Harry Blain. In April 2015, Di Donna assumed full ownership of the gallery which is now called Di Donna Galleries.

References

External links 
Blain|Di Donna official website
Blouin Artinfo: Film on Paul Delvaux at Blain|Di Donna

1971 births
Living people
French art dealers
Businesspeople from Paris
French emigrants to the United States
Alumni of the Courtauld Institute of Art